Gam Malludora (1900–1969) was an Indian politician and tribal leader who served as a Member of Parliament. He was born in Koyyuru mandal of Visakhapatnam district, Andhra Pradesh, India in 1900. He was the younger brother of Gam Gantamdora. Their father was Gam Boggudora.

The Gam brothers were close associates of Alluri Sitarama Raju during his tribal fights, attacking the police stations of Krishna Devi Peta, Addateegala and Annavaram and procuring ammunition for their assault missions. However, he took shelter in a house in 1923. During this time, the British arrested him and prosecuted him with the death sentence. On his appeal, the death sentence was changed in 1924 to life imprisonment at Andaman Jail. He was released in 1937 on the perusal of Congress politicians. In this way, he became the only associate of Raju to survive the British assault.

He was elected to the 1st Lok Sabha from Visakhapatnam constituency in 1952 as an Independent candidate along with Lanka Sundaram.

External links
 Biodata of Gam Malludora at Lok Sabha website.

1900 births
1969 deaths
India MPs 1952–1957
Indian National Congress politicians from Andhra Pradesh
Lok Sabha members from Andhra Pradesh
People from Visakhapatnam district
Telugu politicians
Prisoners and detainees of British India
Indian revolutionaries